Mahela Vijelath (born 5 September 1981) is a Sri Lankan cricketer. He made his List A debut for Ampara District in the 2016–17 Districts One Day Tournament on 18 March 2017. He made his Twenty20 debut for Badureliya Sports Club in the 2017–18 SLC Twenty20 Tournament on 2 March 2018.

References

External links
 

1981 births
Living people
Sri Lankan cricketers
Ampara District cricketers
Badureliya Sports Club cricketers